John Bowle may refer to:

 John Bowle (historian) (1905–1985), English historian and writer
 John Bowle (writer) (1725–1788), English clergyman and scholar; the first Hispanist
 John Bowle (bishop) (died 1637), English churchman and bishop of Rochester

See also
 John Bowles (disambiguation)